Hamayoshi Masanori (born 5 July 1971) is a Japanese football manager who last was the manager of SV Horn.

References

External links
 

1971 births
Living people
SV Horn managers
Japanese football managers
Japanese expatriate football managers
Expatriate football managers in Austria